Shay Schual-Berke (born January 14, 1952) is a former American politician who served as a member of the Washington House of Representatives from 1999 to 2009.  She represented Washington's 33rd legislative district as a Democrat.  Before election to the legislature, she served from 1995 to 1999 as a member of the Highline School Board.

Her community service has included work for Northwest Harvest, Mount Rainier High School Foundation, among others.  In the legislature, she served on multiple committees, with leadership roles including vice-chair of the health care committee (1999 and 2001) and chair of the financial institutions and insurance committee (2003).

References

Further reading
 “Politics: Shay Schual-Berke,” The Seattle Times, October 15, 2004.

1952 births
Living people
Democratic Party members of the Washington House of Representatives
Women state legislators in Washington (state)
Washington University in St. Louis alumni
New York Medical College alumni
Oregon Health & Science University alumni